is a Japanese former professional baseball pitcher. He has played in Nippon Professional Baseball (NPB) for the Chiba Lotte Marines, Hokkaido Nippon-Ham Fighters and Yomiuri Giants.

Career
Chiba Lotte Marines selected Fujioka with the first selection in the 2011 NPB draft.

On April 1, 2012, Fujioka made his NPB debut.

On December 2, 2020, he become a free agent.

On January 6, 2021, Fujioka announced his retirement.

References

External links

NPB

1989 births
Living people
Baseball people from Gunma Prefecture
Chiba Lotte Marines players
Hokkaido Nippon-Ham Fighters players
Japanese baseball players
Nippon Professional Baseball pitchers
Toyo University alumni
Yomiuri Giants players